Tit! (An Opera) is the debut studio album of Dogbowl, released in 1989 by Shimmy Disc. It was re-issued on CD in 1992 with six additional songs. In 2023, it was re-released by Needlejuice Records to include all tracks from the CD and original cassette issue.

Track listing

Personnel
Adapted from Tit! (An Opera) liner notes.

 Dogbowl – lead vocals, guitar, drums, percussion, cover art, illustrations
Musicians
 Charles Curtis – cello
 Kramer – bass guitar, guitar, percussion, production, engineering
 Lee Ming Tah – Hawaiian lap steel guitar
 Chris Tunney – clarinet, organ, backing vocals

Production and additional personnel
 David Larr – art direction
 Michael Macioce – photography
 Angel Marcloid – remastering (2023 reissue)

Release history

References

External links 
 
 Tit! (An Opera) at Bandcamp

1989 debut albums
Albums produced by Kramer (musician)
Dogbowl albums
Shimmy Disc albums